Defending champions Andrew Lapthorne and David Wagner defeated Dylan Alcott and Bryan Barten in the final, 3–6, 6–0, [10–4] to win the quad doubles wheelchair tennis title at the 2018 US Open.

Seeds

Draw

Bracket

External links 

 Draw

Wheelchair Quad Doubles
U.S. Open, 2018 Quad Doubles